Közen is a Turkish surname. Notable people with the surname include:

 Dexter Kozen, American theoretical computer scientist
 Ömer Közen, Turkish footballer

Turkish-language surnames